The Blackwall Tunnel is a pair of road tunnels underneath the River Thames in east London, England, linking the London Borough of Tower Hamlets with the Royal Borough of Greenwich, and part of the A102 road. The northern portal lies just south of the East India Dock Road (A13) in Blackwall; the southern entrances are just south of The O2 on the Greenwich Peninsula. The road is managed by Transport for London (TfL).

The tunnel was originally opened as a single bore in 1897 by the Prince of Wales, as a major transport project to improve commerce and trade in London's East End, and supported a mix of foot, cycle, horse-drawn and vehicular traffic. By the 1930s, capacity was becoming inadequate, and consequently a second bore opened in 1967, handling southbound traffic while the earlier 19th century tunnel handles northbound.

The northern approach takes traffic from the A12 and the southern approach takes traffic from the A2, making the tunnel crossing a key link for both local and longer-distance traffic between the north and south sides of the river. It forms part of a key route into Central London from South East London and Kent and was the easternmost all-day crossing for vehicles before the opening of the Dartford Tunnel in 1963. 

It remains the easternmost free fixed road crossing of the Thames, and regularly suffers congestion, to the extent that tidal flow schemes were in place from 1978 until controversially removed in 2007. Given the very high traffic volumes at the crossing (and the height restrictions of the Victorian bore) the crossing is being supplemented by the Silvertown Tunnel, currently under construction. When the Silvertown Tunnel is completed in 2025, both it and the Blackwall Tunnels will be tolled.

The tunnels are no longer open to pedestrians, cyclists or other non-motorised traffic, and the northbound tunnel has a  height limit. The London Buses route 108 between Lewisham and Stratford runs through the tunnels.

History

Old tunnel

A tunnel in the Blackwall area was originally proposed in the 1880s. A bridge was not feasible due to shipping in the River Thames in East London. According to Robert Webster, then MP for St Pancras East, a tunnel would "be very useful to the East End of London, a district representing in trade and commerce a population greater than the combined populations of Liverpool, Manchester and Birmingham." By this time, all road bridges in London east of the ferry at Chiswick were toll-free, but these were of little use to the two fifths of London's population that lived to the east of London Bridge. 

The Thames Tunnel (Blackwall) Act was created in August 1887, which provided the legal framework necessary to construct the tunnel. The initial proposal, made by Sir Joseph Bazalgette, called for three parallel tunnels, two for vehicular traffic and one for foot, with an expected completion date of works within seven years. It was originally commissioned by the Metropolitan Board of Works but, just before the contract was due to start, responsibility passed to the London County Council (LCC) when the former body was abolished in 1889 and Bazalgette's work on the tunnel ended.

The original tunnel as built was designed by Sir Alexander Binnie and built by S. Pearson & Sons, between 1892 and 1897, for whom Ernest William Moir was the lead engineer. It was constructed using a Greathead tunnelling shield and compressed air techniques (named after its inventor, James Henry Greathead). It was lit by three rows of incandescent street lights. To clear the site in Greenwich, more than 600 people had to be rehoused, and a house reputedly once owned by Sir Walter Raleigh had to be demolished. The work force was largely drawn from immigrants; the tunnel lining was manufactured in Glasgow, while the manual labour came from provincial England, particularly Yorkshire.

The tunnel was officially opened by the Prince of Wales on 22 May 1897. The total cost of the tunnel was £1.4 M and 800 men were employed in its construction, during which seven deaths were recorded.

The southern entrance gateway to the tunnel, also known as Southern Tunnel House, was designed by LCC architect Thomas Blashill and was built just before the tunnel was completed. It comprises two floors with an attic.

The tunnel has several sharp bends, in order that the tunnel could align with Northumberland Wharf to the north and Ordnance Wharf to the south, and avoid a sewer underneath Bedford Street. Some sources state an additional purpose was to prevent horses from bolting once they saw daylight. The tunnel carries two lanes of traffic, though higher vehicles need to keep to the left-hand lane so that they do not hit the tunnel's inner lining.

New tunnel

Due to the increase in motor traffic in the early 20th century, the capacity of the original tunnel was soon perceived as inadequate. In 1930, John Mills, MP for Dartford, remarked that HGVs delivering from Essex to Kent could not practically use any crossing of the Thames downstream of the tunnel. The LCC obtained an act to construct a new tunnel in 1938, but work did not start due to the outbreak of World War II. Construction eventually started in 1958 with preliminary work on the northern approach road. By this time, traffic had become progressively worse. In 1960, Richard Marsh, MP for Greenwich complained that vehicles could spend 30 to 45 minutes stuck in tunnel traffic.

The new eastern tunnel,  in diameter, was accepted into the roads programme in March 1959, and construction started in March 1960. It was opened on 2 August 1967 by Desmond Plummer, Leader of the Greater London Council (GLC). During construction, transport minister Ernest Marples clarified that unlike the Dartford Tunnel, also then under construction, tolls would not be imposed as the tunnel was already an established route. 

At the time of opening, the strip lighting in the tunnel was commended as "a big improvement" on the standard provided in the original tunnel. In contrast with the Victorian northbound tunnel, the eastern tunnel had no sharp bends, and emergency telephones were provided. Its distinctive ventilation towers were designed in 1964 by GLC architect Terry Farrell. Immediately after opening, the old tunnel was closed for refurbishment. It re-opened on 4 April 1969 with a new electronic system to detect overheight vehicles.

In the late 1960s, proposals were made to connect the tunnel with a free-flow, grade-separated motorway system as part of the London Ringways project. Aside from the construction of the A102(M) Blackwall Tunnel approach roads, opened in 1973, these plans were abandoned.

The entrance gateway to the northbound tunnel was Grade II listed in 1973, while the ventilation towers were listed in 2000. In April 1986, the tunnel became part of the UK trunk road network. It was detrunked and control handed to TfL in September 1999.

Provisional IRA bombing
On 18 January 1979, an anonymous caller to the Press Association informed them that the Provisional IRA had planted a bomb in the tunnel that was scheduled to detonate at midnight. While the Metropolitan Police were searching the tunnel, the bomb detonated at 12:40 a.m., causing an explosion in a gas holder near the southern exit. This resulted in a fire on another gas holder approximately an hour later. No injuries were reported. Speaking in the House of Commons, Home Secretary Merlyn Rees hoped "the House will join me in condemning these attacks and will support the Government in their determination not to be swayed by such methods". A Belfast man was jailed in May 1983 for his role in the bombing, and was eventually released at the end of his sentence some 17½ years later, still professing pride in his IRA participation.

Nearest alternative crossings
TfL state that one of the major issues with the Blackwall Tunnels is the lack of resilience in the event of an incident—as the nearest alternative road crossings are the Rotherhithe Tunnel  to the west, Tower Bridge  to the west, and the Dartford Crossing  to the east. Variable message signs (VMS) near the tunnel inform drivers if the ferry is available. When open, queuing for the ferry causes significant congestion around Woolwich town centre.

Underground railway links include the Jubilee line from North Greenwich (TfL) to Canning Town on the east and Canary Wharf on the west. The Docklands Light Railway also passes under the Thames between Island Gardens at the southern end of the Isle of Dogs and Cutty Sark in the centre of Greenwich.

Horse-drawn traffic was partially banned from the tunnel during peak hours in July 1939 and completely banned in August 1947. Pedestrians have been banned from using the Blackwall Tunnels since May 1969.

The London Buses route 108 (Stratford–Lewisham) runs through the tunnels and there are bus priority gates at both entrances to allow buses to avoid traffic congestion. On occasion in the past, the bus service has been escorted through the tunnel when it has been closed.

Traffic management
The northbound Blackwall Tunnel is a traffic bottleneck with tailbacks. A TfL study in 2009 revealed that the  approach to the northbound tunnel took around 19 minutes in rush hour traffic, or a delay of approximately 11 minutes per kilometre. To relieve the congestion, a tidal flow system was introduced in 1978, allowing northbound traffic to use the western lane of the eastern tunnel. The congestion is not limited to weekday rush hours. There is often congestion with tailbacks at the weekends, especially on Sunday evenings.
Due to its sharp turns with restricted headroom, high-sided vehicles can only use the left-hand lane of the western tunnel, so it was not possible to reverse the tidal flow in the evening. In April 2007, the morning tidal flow was discontinued, after reports by TfL and the Metropolitan Police (MPS) of an increase in dangerous motoring behaviour; these blamed poor driving, such as overtaking, for the decrease in safety during counterflow operations. The decision to end the counterflow was controversial, particularly as TfL and the MPS had been considering it since 2005, without properly informing affected borough councils, and an independent committee was set up to evaluate the decision. The ending of the counterflow system has brought protests from users of the tunnel and those experiencing increased congestion due to the change.

In November 2007, the Mayor of London, Ken Livingstone responded to complaints from Greenwich Council about congestion in the area, with the possibility of setting up a small congestion charging zone. He clarified that this would not extend to the Blackwall Tunnel, stating "I have given that commitment right the way through my period as Mayor, and there cannot be anything that impacts on the A2 because the impact then on Lewisham is unacceptable." In 2012, TfL announced their intention to toll the tunnels to pay for the Silvertown Link crossing, suggesting it was the "most appropriate way". Responding to this, Paul Watters from the AA said "We’ve already seen the Western extension of the congestion charge dropped because it was hugely unpopular and I think tolling on the Blackwall Tunnel will be as controversial as that."

In June 2013, TfL announced they would send registration details of any broken-down or over-height commercial vehicle in the tunnel to the Vehicle and Operator Services Agency (VOSA), and set up a new automatic recognition system to detect unsuitable heavy goods vehicles heading towards it. TfL commissioner Sir Peter Hendy said that "this partnership working will help improve traffic flow on one of the busiest routes in the capital."

Maintenance and closures

The Blackwall Tunnel has attracted criticism in the past for its perceived lack of safety. In 2002, a survey by major motoring organisations rated the tunnel's safety record as "very poor", and concluded it was one of the least safe tunnels in Europe. In 2010, the northbound tunnel was refurbished in order to meet current safety standards. Fire detection systems have been installed in response to new European regulations in the light of recent tunnel fires.

In 2010, the southbound tunnel was affected by planned closures for maintenance from 10 pm to 5 am, Thursday to Sunday inclusive, and over a number of whole weekends. The tunnel was only closed six full weekends instead of the planned ten.

The tunnel also suffers regular problems with strikes from over-height traffic, and vehicles running out of fuel. On 10 December 1996, a man drove a Mercedes truck supporting a crane towards the southbound tunnel, ignored warnings that his vehicle was over-height, and struck a gantry, breaking a steel reinforcement frame in the process. The entire tunnel was immediately closed, not only to retrieve the vehicle, but to perform additional safety checks. Because the Limehouse Link tunnel, which runs near to the north end of the Blackwall Tunnel, and the Queen Elizabeth II Bridge, part of the Dartford Crossing, were also closed on the same day, the accident caused one of the worst traffic jams in the capital. In February 2011, TfL reported that the tunnel had been closed 1,200 times in the previous year for a total of 157 hours, while New Civil Engineer magazine claimed it shut 1,448 times in 2010. To try to prevent closures of this nature, an LED noticeboard was set up in the northbound approach, counting the number of breakdowns and accidents per month occurring inside the tunnel.

During the 2010s the tunnel has been closed to motor traffic to provide cyclists access to the RideLondon event, although this arrangement is no longer in place.

Future

The Blackwall Tunnel is the only major road crossing of the Thames in East London, and consequently has very high traffic volumes. Furthermore, the limitations of the western bore of the tunnel (not accessible to vehicles taller than ), means that larger HGV and double decker buses cannot pass through the tunnel in both directions. Given this, an expansion of the crossing has been proposed for many years—such as a third bore of the tunnel, proposed in 1989—however none of these proposals have come to fruition. 

Following the cancellation of the Thames Gateway Bridge in 2008, a new crossing from the Greenwich Peninsula to Silvertown—the Silvertown Tunnel—was proposed by TfL. Following a public inquiry, the government approved the proposal in May 2018, and the contract to build the tunnel was awarded in November 2019. Construction began in March 2021.

When completed, the Silvertown Tunnel will have two tunnels, one for each direction—with a dedicated HGV and bus lane. This will allow a substantial increase in cross-river traffic and bus services, as the new tunnel will be able to be used by double decker buses. Following completion of the new crossing in around 2025, both the Silvertown and Blackwall tunnels will be tolled.

See also
List of crossings of the River Thames
Tunnels underneath the River Thames

References

Coordinates

External links

 Video of the Tunnel (Chris' British Road Directory)

Tunnels underneath the River Thames
Tunnels in London
Transport in the London Borough of Tower Hamlets
Transport in the Royal Borough of Greenwich
Terry Farrell buildings
Road tunnels in England
Grade II listed buildings in the Royal Borough of Greenwich
Grade II listed tunnels
Tunnels completed in 1897
Tunnels completed in 1967
1897 establishments in England